Club Atlético Huracán, usually known as Huracán de Ingeniero White, is an Argentine football club based in the city of Bahía Blanca. It played in First Division in the years 1968 and 1971.

Foundation

The club was founded in the neighborhood named Boulevard Juan B. Justo on May 27, 1916. Ingeniero White is the name of the population near the port of Bahía Blanca. In this place, Huracán plays its derby with Puerto Comercial.

The swollen is known as "La Fiel" (The Faithful); and his fans are known as "cangrejeros" for the populations of crabs which are numerous in the coast of Bahía Blanca.

Huracán is affiliated to the Liga del Sur. In that league, won two championships: 1967y1970.

First Division

Huracán won the Torneo Regional in 1968 and classified to the Torneo Nacional of that year. The club was the second named ‘’Huracán’’ in First Division, after the club of Parque Patricios (Autonomous City). In this competition the team obtained two wins and two draws. Also, loses a match with Huracán of Buenos Aires City (3–0).

In 1971, Huracán returns to First Division winning the Torneo Regional. In this tournament, the club obtains two wins and four draws and tied a match with Huracán de Comodoro Rivadavia (0–0).

Huracán took part in two Nacional championships, in 1968 and 1971. In total, seven teams named "Huracán" participated in the first level of the Argentine football. Actually, the club of Ingeniero White is in the 85th place in the historical ranking of Argentine First Division

Stadium

The name of the stadium is Bruno Lentini, in honor of the president of the club between 1947 and 1951. It has got a capacity of 4,200 people and it is in the neighborhood ‘’Boulevard Juan B. Justo’’.

Principal results in First Division

Wins:
vs. Central Córdoba de Santiago del Estero: 2–0 (1971)
vs. Guaraní Antonio Franco de Posadas: 3–2 (1971)
vs. Estudiantes de La Plata: 1–0 (1968)
vs. San Martín de Tucumán: 1–0 (1968)
Ties (visitant):
vs. Racing: 0–0
vs. Estudiantes de La Plata: 0–0

Titles
 Liga del Sur: 3
 1967, 1970, 2015

References

External links

Official site 
Huracán blog 

Bahía Blanca
Football clubs in Buenos Aires Province
Association football clubs established in 1916
1916 establishments in Argentina